Castelmassa is a comune (municipality) in the Province of Rovigo in the Italian region Veneto, located about  southwest of Venice and about  west of Rovigo.   
Castelmassa borders the following municipalities: Calto, Castelnovo Bariano, Ceneselli, Felonica, Sermide.

People 

 Bonaventura Porta, (1866–1953), bishop of Pesaro

International relations

Twin towns — Sister cities
Castelmassa is twinned with:
 Gniew, Poland

References

External links
 Official website

Cities and towns in Veneto